The Erlitou culture was an early Bronze Age urban society and archaeological culture that existed in the Yellow River valley from approximately 1900 to 1500 BC. A 2007 study of radiocarbon dating proposed a narrower date range of 1750 to 1530 BC. The culture was named after the site discovered at Erlitou in Yanshi, Henan. It was widely spread throughout Henan and Shanxi and later appeared in Shaanxi and Hubei. Most archaeologists consider Erlitou the first state-level society in China. Chinese archaeologists generally identify the Erlitou culture as the site of the Xia dynasty, but there is no firm evidence, such as writing, to substantiate such a linkage, as the earliest evidence of Chinese writing dates to the late Shang dynasty.

Erlitou site 

The Erlitou culture may have evolved from the matrix of Longshan culture. Originally centered around Henan and Shanxi province, the culture spread to Shaanxi and Hubei provinces. After the rise of the Erligang culture, the site at Erlitou diminished in size but remained inhabited.

Discovered in 1959 by Xu Xusheng, Erlitou is the largest site associated with the culture, with palace buildings and bronze smelting workshops. Erlitou monopolized the production of ritual bronze vessels, including the earliest recovered dings. The city is on the Yi River, a tributary of the Luo River, which flows into the Yellow River.

The Erlitou Relic Museum, located in Luoyang, Henan province, which has more than 2,000 items excavated from the Erlitou site in its collection, opened in October 2019.

Phases

The site's growth is divided into four phases.

During Phase I, covering , Erlitou was a rapidly growing regional center with an estimated population of several thousand people, but not yet an urban civilization.

It contained the  Palace 3, composed of three courtyards along a 150-metre axis, and Palace 5. A bronze foundry was established to the south of the palatial complex and was controlled by the elite.

The city reached its peak in Phase III, and may have had a population of around 24,000. The palatial complex was surrounded by a two-meter-thick rammed-earth wall, and Palaces 1, 7, 8 and 9 were built.

In Phase IV, the population decreased to around 20,000, but building continued. Palace 6 was built as an extension of Palace 2, and Palaces 10 and 11 were built. Phase IV overlaps with the Lower Phase of the Erligang culture (1600–1450 BC).

Production of bronzes and other elite goods ceased at the end of Phase IV, at the same time as the Erligang city of Zhengzhou was established  to the east.

Bronze in Erlitou

Erlitou is the earliest large-scale bronze industry discovered in China, with the new-fashioned section-mold process there to produce ritual vessels and other bronzes.

Although the remains of bronze have been found in the Qijia Culture and Siba Culture, the progress and achievements of the Erlitou Culture bronze casting industry are far beyond the reach of the Qijia Culture and the Siba Culture. The Erlitou culture not only has bronze tools and bell musical instruments, but also bronze weapons and unique animal-faced plaques, especially more than ten kinds of bronze vessels have been unearthed. This shows that the bronze casting of Erlitou is diverse and systematic.

The bronzes of the Erlitou culture have obvious features of imitating pottery, with plain surfaces or simple geometric patterns. In the third phase of the Erlitou culture, the perforated decoration that was very popular throughout the Erlitou culture appeared on the bronze Jue.

The earliest bronze Ding have been found in China, unearthed in the fourth stage of the Erlitou culture, decorated with striped grid patterns.

Inventions

The earliest metal bells, with one found in the Taosi site, and four in the Erlitou site, dated to about 2000 BC, may have been derived from the earlier pottery prototype.

The first bronze dagger-axe or ge appeared at the Erlitou site, where two were being found among the over 200 bronze artifacts (as of 2002) at the site, three jade ge were also discovered from the same site.

Relation to traditional accounts

A major goal of archaeology in China has been the search for the capitals of the Xia and Shang dynasties described in traditional accounts as inhabiting the Yellow River valley. These originally oral traditions were recorded much later in histories such as the Bamboo Annals and the Records of the Grand Historian (1st century BC), and their historicity, particularly regarding the Xia, is an area of debate for the Doubting Antiquity School of Chinese history. The discovery of writing in the form of oracle bones at Yinxu in Anyang definitively established the site as the last capital of the Shang, but such evidence is unavailable for earlier sites.

When Xu Xusheng first discovered Erlitou, he suggested that it was Bo, the first capital of the Shang under King Tang in the traditional account. Since the late 1970s, archaeologists in China have tended to identify the site with Zhenxun, the last Xia capital. The traditional account of the overthrow of the Xia by the Shang has been identified with the ends of each of the four phases of the site by different authors.  The Xia–Shang–Zhou Chronology Project identified all four phases of Erlitou as Xia, and the construction of the Yanshi walled city as the founding of the Shang. Other scholars, particularly outside China, point to the lack of any firm evidence for such an identification, and argue that the historiographical focus of Chinese archaeology is unduly limiting.

Archaeological evidence of a large outburst flood at Jishi Gorge that destroyed the Lajia site on the upper reaches of the Yellow River has been dated to about 1920 BC. This date is shortly before the rise of the Erlitou culture in the middle Yellow River valley and the Yueshi culture in Shandong, following the decline of the Longshan culture in the North China Plain. The authors suggest that this flood may have been the basis for the later myth, and contributed to the transition of cultures. They further argue that the timing is further evidence for the identification of the Xia with the Erlitou culture.
However, no evidence of contemporaneous widespread flooding in the North China Plain has yet been found.

See also

List of Neolithic cultures of China
Three Sovereigns and Five Emperors
Women in ancient and imperial China

References

Works cited
 
 
 
 
 
 
 
 
 
 
 
 
  Original article in Kaogu 2007.8: 74–84.

Further reading

External links 

Bronze Age China, The Golden Age of Chinese Archaeology: Exhibition brochure, National Gallery of Art.
Erlitou Site, Erlitou Site – Relics of the Capital of the Xia Dynasty, Cultural China

1959 archaeological discoveries
Archaeological cultures of China
Bronze Age in China
Xia dynasty
Yanshi
2nd-millennium BC establishments in China
19th-century BC establishments